Identity management theory (also frequently referred to as IMT) is an intercultural communication theory from the 1990s. It was developed by William R. Cupach and Tadasu Todd Imahori on the basis of Erving Goffman's Interaction ritual: Essays on face-to-face behavior (1967). Cupach and Imahori distinguish between intercultural communication (speakers from different cultures) and intracultural communication (speakers sharing the same culture).

To understand IMT, it is important to be familiar with Cupach and Imahori's view of identities. Among the multiple identities which an individual possesses, cultural and relational identities are regarded as essential to IMT.

There are two ways of IMT. Cupach and Imahori claim that presenting one's face shows facets of an individual's identity. Whether an interlocuter is able to maintain face or not, reveals his or her interpersonal communication competence. The use of stereotypes in intercultural conversations often results from the ignorance of each other's culture; the application of stereotypes, however, is face threatening. Being able to manage the resulting tensions, is part of intercultural communication competence. For becoming competent in developing intercultural relationships, the following three phases have to be passed:
 "trial and error": act of looking for similar aspects in certain identities. 
 "mixing up" the communicators' identities to achieve a relational identity acceptable for both participants
 renegotiating the distinctive cultural identities with the help of the relational identity that was created in phase 2
Cupach and Imahori call these phases "cyclical" as they are gone through by intercultural communicators for each aspect of their identities.

Erving Goffman is an author off of which the originators of IMT based their theory. Goffman was a well-known sociologist and writer and the most cited sociologist from his writings because of what he studied in communication. Among the six essays that make up Goffman's book, the first essay shows an individual's self-image while engaging in communicating with another individual. The author explained that the self-image that is obtained during interacting is not permanent and has a large social influence. The image someone gets in a social setting is than expected for the future. The risk of changing self-image in a social context will alter how the individual feels about oneself. The author was implying that oftentimes the defense mechanism is to retract from showing your self to much in a social setting so others do not see them in a displeasing way. The idea of the identity management theory uses the ideas of Goffman to help establish what the idea behind the theory is trying to get at.

Intercultural verse intracultural communication varies significantly. Intercultural communication is based on a much greater scheme of things. This type of communication refers to a group of people that differ in backgrounds, whether that is religion, ethnic, education, or social backgrounds. Intercultural communication looks at how the world is viewed, how messages are interpreted, and how differing cultures react to situations [Communication ]. On the contrary, intracultural communication discusses how people of the same background interact with one another. I thought it was interesting that there was not a Wikipedia page discussing this concept. It is very important to compare and contrast intercultural communication to understand the similarities and differences. With little research conducted on intracultural communication, I am unable to correlate the two types of communication.

The last concept to expand on is identity. Identity is directly connected with the identity management theory since it helps define what this theory is trying to explain.  Even though identity is a very broad topic, I will discuss personal identity through the lens of the individual, which will than effect its social identity. Identity is said to be the "distinct personality of an individual" identity. Identity can be the view that people hold about themselves. Also, identity is the perception that people hold about themselves in a social setting. Identity has many subtopics that distinguish why this theory is specific and different from other identity theories. Specific characteristics explain how people feel about themselves as an individual and in a social setting.

Identity management strategies
Social identity theory suggests that individuals and groups use different identity management strategies to cope with threatened identities.
In a study conducted in Northern Ireland five identity management strategies were tested to see the effects of the person's identity in light of other people.
The five strategies included
 Individualization
 Social competition
 Change of comparison dimensions
 Temporal comparisons
 Subordinate re-categorization

The five strategies previously listed can further be separated into two subgroups depending on the style of how they are manifested. These two subgroups are:

Individual strategies 
 Individualization
 Subordinate re-categorization

Collective strategies
 Social competition 
 Change of comparison dimensions
 Temporal comparisons

See also
cf. Identity management

References

 Cupach, William R. and Tadasu Todd Imahori. (1993), "Identity management theory: Communication competence in intercultural episodes and relationships", in R. L. Wiseman and J. Koester (eds.), Intercultural communication competence, 112-131, Newbury Park, CA: Sage.
 Goffman, Erving. (1967), Interaction ritual: Essays on face-to-face behavior. Garden City, NY: Anchor.
 Gudykunst, William B. (2003), "Intercultural Communication Theories", in: Gudykunst, William B (ed.), Cross-Cultural and Intercultural Communication, 167-189, Thousand Oaks: Sage.

Identity management
Interpersonal communication